In video games, a silent protagonist is a player character who lacks any dialogue for the entire duration of a game, with the possible exception of occasional interjections or short phrases. In some games, especially visual novels, this may extend to protagonists who have dialogue, but no voice acting like all other non-player characters.
A silent protagonist may be employed to lend a sense of mystery or uncertainty of identity to the gameplay, or to help the player identify better with them. Silent protagonists may also be anonymous. Not all silent protagonists are necessarily mute or do not speak to other characters; they may simply not produce any dialogue audible to the player.

Origin
The earliest player characters in video games of the 1980s, including the likes of Mario, Metroids Samus, and The Legend of Zeldas Link, were silent protagonists. Characters such as these may occasionally speak through text or audible words, but are otherwise limited to making gestures, inarticulate noises, or remaining entirely silent.

The same was true for early role playing games. These games originated from pen and paper games such as Dungeons & Dragons and when put on the screen, did not require any spoken dialogue, since the games' plot and mechanics were all picture and motion based. Players are expected to put themselves into the role of the silent hero, and since the player does not talk in the game, neither does their on-screen avatar.

Uses
Many early videogames made use of a silent protagonist out of utility, because of technology, time, or budget limitations, or as a narrative device. Whether the player is supposed to be the protagonist or is merely assuming control of an established character and whether the game allows the player freedom of choices that would be difficult to believably justify with spoken narrative influence this decision. Some have cited the 1993 game Myst as an example of a first person adventure where the main character is merely an avatar for the player's choices and dialogue would not be needed or helpful. The 2001 game Grand Theft Auto III has no dialogue for its protagonist, as is common for games of its time, and this allows players of many backgrounds and personalities to identify with the character they control in the game's open world environment.

In most of the games of the Command & Conquer series (e.g. the 2000 game Red Alert 2 or 2007's Tiberium Wars), the game treats the actual player as the protagonist. Game characters talk to the player as if talking to one present among them, and the camera angle matches the player's eyes. As such, no traces of the protagonist could be found in the game, including voice. Similarly, in the 1996 game Lords of the Realm II, the player operates a protagonist who is not only silent, but also lacks a body (and a face, when seen as an avatar). Invisible serfs and servants in turn report to the player in the form of announcements, pointed commentary, and comic bathos.

In the Half-Life series, the protagonist is the silent Gordon Freeman, but is distinct from the player. Game writer Marc Laidlaw, who worked on Half-Life and Portal (both of which feature silent protagonists) with game developer Valve, stated that he did not recommend keeping protagonists silent due to the difficulties that arise during development, but noted that limiting oneself to a silent protagonist can lead to more creativity.

Silent protagonists can also apply to the avatars of certain games such as Minecraft and Terraria, where player characters are free to interact with their surrounding environments (either on single-player or multiplayer), without the need of any spoken dialogues, and can only make noise when hurt. Both games also use a chat system that allow players to communicate with other players through typing; however, this system does not affect the gameplay itself.

Serge's status as a silent protagonist in the 1999 role-playing video game Chrono Cross is used as a narrative hint for the player at one point to demonstrate that he is no longer himself by having him begin participating in dialogue.

Critical reaction
Reception has varied widely according to its use, ranging from praise for its help immersing a player in the game, with titles such as Half-Life 2 and franchises such as Mario and The Legend of Zelda frequently cited, while the protagonist's lack of communication has at times been noted as hindersome to plot development, as in one reviewer's comments on Grand Theft Auto III, or multiple accounts on the Crash Bandicoot franchise. Others have stated that real immersion in a game would require a character to speak, since in such situations, the player would naturally vocalize and the protagonist does not.

CJ Miozzi called franchises that still use the technique a "crutch" for bad storytelling, saying "just as narration has become a hallmark of terrible movies through improper use, silent protagonists have become the trademarks of a weak storyline in a game."

References

Video game terminology